Fabriciana vorax is an East Palearctic butterfly in the family Nymphalidae (Heliconiinae). 

It is found in Japan, Korea, Northeast and Central China, South east Tibet, Sakhalin and Ussur

References

Fabriciana
Butterflies described in 1871